Lennon's Circus (established circa 1890) is a circus that tours in Australia.  Its touring schedule covers Australia from the remotest towns to the largest cities. Touring for 11 months, before completing their season in late November.

History 
The Lennon family are the only circus family in Australia who make their own circus big tops and marquees. They also made SuperTents for rock concerts such as Homebake and The Big Day Out.

It is one of only three circuses left in Australia with big cats in their programme. The three lions at Lennon's are 4 years of age, 2 females and 1 male from different litters.

Performance 
The Lennon Bros Circus showcases a wide variety of circus arts such as tumblers, flying trapeze, hula hoops, acrobats, double wheel of death, aerialists and clowns. Animals include Liberty horses, liberty donkeys, monkeys, camels, llamas, goats, geese, lions and dogs.
The circus employs a staff of 35 people, ranging in age from 3 years to 65 years. The circus is moved on 14 trucks, 2 semi trailers and 14 caravans.

See also
List of circuses and circus owners

References

External links

Australian circuses
1890 establishments in Australia
Entertainment companies established in 1890
Performing groups established in the 1880s